Lucy Acosta may refer to:

Lucy G. Acosta (1926–2008), Mexican-American activist
Lucy Acosta, character in Shannon's Deal